Armells Creek is a stream in Fergus County, in the U.S. state of Montana.  It is a tributary of the Missouri River.

Armells Creek was named for Augustin Hamell, a fur trader. The extinct town of Armells, Montana was located near the creek.

See also
List of rivers of Montana

References

Rivers of Fergus County, Montana
Rivers of Montana